Queensland Pacific Airlines was an Australian airline which commenced operations on 4 December 1988; the following year purchased Sungold Airlines and on 1 March 1991 ceased operations while the assets were acquired by Southern Pacific Regional Airlines.

Destinations
It conducted services between the following centres:  Brisbane, Bundaberg, Gladstone, Rockhampton, Mackay, Townsville, Blackwater, Thangool, Coolangatta and Newcastle.

Fleet
It operated Nord Mohawk aircraft and Embraer EMB 110 Bandeirantes.

See also
List of defunct airlines of Australia
 Aviation in Australia

References

Airlines established in 1988
Airlines disestablished in 1991
Defunct airlines of Australia